Muco may refer to:

People
 Betim Muço (1947–2015), Albanian writer
 Fatos Muço (born 1949), Albanian chess player
 Skënder Muço (1904–1944), Albanian resistance leader

Places
 Muco River, Chile

Other
 Lovely Muco, Japanese manga series
 Muco-Inositol, taste modality of the mammalian nervous system